is a private women's junior college in Uwajima, Ehime, Japan, established in 1966.

External links
 Official website 

Japanese junior colleges
Educational institutions established in 1966
Private universities and colleges in Japan
Universities and colleges in Ehime Prefecture
1966 establishments in Japan